Send It On may refer to:

"Send It On" (D'Angelo song), 2000
"Send It On" (Disney song), 2009